The 1989 Western Australian state election was held on 4 February 1989.

Retiring Members

Labor

Ron Bertram MLA (Balcatta)
David Evans MLA (Warren)
Tom Jones MLA (Collie)
Des Dans MLC (South Metropolitan)
Bob Hetherington MLC (South-East Metropolitan)

Liberal

Bert Crane MLA (Moore)
Ross Lightfoot MLA (Murchison-Eyre)
Reg Tubby MLA (Greenough)
Tony Williams MLA (Clontarf)
Colin Bell MLC (Lower West)
Gordon Masters MLC (West Province)
John Williams MLC (Metropolitan Province)

National

Matt Stephens MLA (Stirling)
Harry Gayfer MLC (Central Province)
Tom McNeil MLC (Upper West)

Legislative Assembly
Sitting members are shown in bold text. Successful candidates are highlighted in the relevant colour. Where there is possible confusion, an asterisk (*) is also used.

Legislative Council

Sitting members are shown in bold text. Tickets that elected at least one MLC are highlighted in the relevant colour. Successful candidates are identified by an asterisk (*).

Agricultural
Five seats were up for election.

East Metropolitan
Five seats were up for election.

Mining and Pastoral
Five seats were up for election.

North Metropolitan
Seven seats were up for election.

South Metropolitan
Five seats were up for election.

South West
Seven seats were up for election.

See also
 Members of the Western Australian Legislative Assembly, 1986–1989
 Members of the Western Australian Legislative Assembly, 1989–1993
 Members of the Western Australian Legislative Council, 1986–1989
 Members of the Western Australian Legislative Council, 1989–1993
 1989 Western Australian state election

References
 

Candidates for Western Australian state elections